Balmy may refer to:

 Coralie Balmy (born 1987), French freestyle swimmer
 Jeremy Balmy (born 1994), French footballer
 Balmy Alley, San Francisco, California, United States